Big Pit Halt railway station is a railway station on the Pontypool and Blaenavon Railway heritage line, adjacent to Big Pit National Coal Museum, Blaenavon, Wales.

 
The station opened on 6 April (Good Friday) 2012, however the line to Big Pit actually opened on Friday 16 September 2011. The single track line and station opened specifically for tourists visiting the museum.

Notes

External links 
 
Photos on the Pontypool and Blaenavon Railway website

Railway stations in Great Britain opened in 2012
Heritage railway stations in Torfaen
Railway stations built for UK heritage railways